Hampea is a genus of flowering plants in the family Malvaceae. They are trees native to Mexico, Central America, and Colombia. There are about 21 species.

Species include:
 Hampea appendiculata
 Hampea breedlovei
 Hampea dukei
 Hampea micrantha
 Hampea montebellensis
 Hampea reynae – Majagua
 Hampea sphaerocarpa
 Hampea thespesioides
 Hampea trilobata

Ecology

Lepidoptera whose caterpillars feed on Hampea include Macrosoma conifera and one or two taxa of the two-barred flasher (Astraptes fulgerator) cryptic species complex.

References

 
Malvaceae genera
Taxonomy articles created by Polbot